Bee is the name of the following newspapers:

California

The McClatchy Company 

The Sacramento Bee, Sacramento, founded in 1857
The Fresno Bee, Fresno, founded in 1922
The Modesto Bee, Modesto

New York 

Bee Group Newspapers
Lancaster Bee,, serving Lancaster, founded in 1877
Amherst Bee, founded in 1879 in Williamsville, New York, by Adam Lorenzo Rinewalt (1849–1902)
Depew Bee, Depew, founded in 1893
Clarence Bee, Clarence, founded in 1937
Ken-Ton Bee, Kenmore and the town of Tonawanda, founded in 1982
Cheektowaga Bee, Cheektowaga, founded in 1977
West Seneca Bee, West Seneca, founded in 1980
Orchard Park Bee, Orchard Park, founded in 1986
East Aurora Bee, East Aurora, founded in 1987

Other areas 
The New Orleans Bee (French: L’Abeille de la Nouvelle-Orléans) (1827-1925), a defunct newspaper based in New Orleans, Louisiana, mainly written in French with an English section
Omaha Bee (1871-1920), a defunct newspaper from Omaha, Nebraska
The Toledo Bee, Toledo, Ohio, merged into The Toledo News-Bee in 1903
Portland Bee, a defunct newspaper in Portland, Oregon
Sellwood Bee, a newspaper based in Sellwood, a neighborhood of Portland, Oregon
Danville Bee, which merged with The Danville Register to form the Danville Register & Bee, Danville, Virginia, in 1989
Washington Bee (1882-1922), a defunct weekly newspaper based in Washington, D.C., primarily read by African-Americans

References

See also
Lake County Record-Bee, Lakeport, California

Bee